The Mercedes-Benz SLK-Class is a compact executive roadster, produced by Mercedes-Benz. It was released in 1996 and was built at the Mercedes plant in Bremen, Germany, until the end of production in 2020.

The former name "SLK" was derived from sportlich (sporty), leicht (lightweight), and kurz (short). With the release of the facelift R172 in 2016, the SLK-Class was renamed to SLC-Class in accordance with the revised nomenclature adopted by Mercedes. Under this scheme, roadsters use the base name "SL", followed by the model's placement in Mercedes-Benz hierarchy, the letter "C", being the roadster equivalent to the C-Class.



First generation (R170; 1996–2004) 

The R170 Mercedes SLK was the first generation compact roadster produced by Mercedes-Benz, from 1996 to 2004. It was designed from late 1991 under Bruno Sacco, with a final design being completed in early 1993 and approved by the board, with a German design patent filed on September 30, 1993. The production SLK-Class was introduced at the Turin Motor Show on 22 April 1996, appearing as a modern incarnation of the 1950s Mercedes-Benz 190SL, by returning to four cylinders and with an identical  wheelbase. A facelift was introduced to all models in 2000, featuring an updated design and updated engines.

Second generation (R171; 2004–2010) 

The R171 SLK was unveiled at the 2004 Geneva Motor Show. It features increased use of high-strength steel, and improvements to the car's torsional strength and aerodynamic efficiency. The R171 also introduced the Airscarf system that integrates neck-level heating system into the headrests of the car. The front-end design of the car was inspired by the noses found in Formula One cars. It was facelifted in 2008 and featured new engines and minor exterior design changes.

Third generation (R172; 2011–2020) 

The R172 SLK was released in 2011. It was available with a range of inline-four, V6, and V8, diesel and petrol engines, and introduced an electronically operated window tint shade for the sunroof, called Magic Sky Control. The facelift was released for vehicles produced from March 2016, to coincide with the 20th anniversary of the SLK-Class. The model range was also renamed to SLC-Class to conform to the new Mercedes nomenclature, and introduced new engines and a revised design. In 2020, Mercedes-Benz released a Final Edition to commemorate the end of the car's production run.

Sales figures 
The following are the sales figures for the SLK-Class since 2001:

References

Notes

Bibliography

External links 
 

SLK-Class
Hardtop convertibles
Roadsters
Euro NCAP roadster sports cars
Rear-wheel-drive vehicles
Cars introduced in 1996
2000s cars
2010s cars